Shimoga Assembly constituency is one of the seats in Karnataka State Assembly in India. It is part of Shimoga Lok Sabha seat.

Members of Assembly 
Source:

Election results

1967 Assembly Election
 A. R. Badrinarayan (INC) : 18,695 votes    
 Y. R. Parameshwarappa (SSP) : 11,598

2013 Assembly Election
 K.B. Prasanna Kumar (INC)
 S Rudregowda (Karnataka Janata Party of Yediyurappa) : 39,077 votes 
 K.S. Eshwarappa (BJP) : 33,462 votes

2018 Assembly Election
 K.S. Eshwarappa (BJP) : 104,027 votes  
 K.B. Prasanna Kumar (INC) : 57,920 votes

See also 
 List of constituencies of Karnataka Legislative Assembly

References 

Assembly constituencies of Karnataka